Kogane Station (黄金駅) is the name of two train stations in Japan:

 Kogane Station (Aichi)
 Kogane Station (Hokkaido)